Faraz Fatemi (born October 4, 1977) is an Iranian retired footballer.

Club career
He has played for a few clubs in Iran, including Fajr Sepasi, Esteghlal and Zob Ahan, as well as Egaleo F.C. in the Greek Beta Ethniki. In July 2006, he joined another IPL club, Persepolis.

After his retirement, he coached Parseh, resigning in March 2016.

Club career statistics

 Assist Goals

International career
Fatemi had a short callup to the Iranian national team during the qualification campaign for the 2002 FIFA World Cup.

International goals

Honours

Esteghlal
 Hazfi Cup (1): 2001–02

Persepolis
Iran's Premier Football League (1): 2007-08

References

External links
 Faraz Fatemi at TeamMelli.com

1977 births
Living people
People from Shiraz
Iranian footballers
Iran international footballers
Association football forwards
Egaleo F.C. players
Fajr Sepasi players
Esteghlal F.C. players
Zob Ahan Esfahan F.C. players
Persepolis F.C. players
Sanat Mes Kerman F.C. players
Machine Sazi F.C. players
Persian Gulf Pro League players
Azadegan League players
Football League (Greece) players
Iranian expatriate footballers
Expatriate footballers in Greece
Iranian expatriate sportspeople in Greece
Sportspeople from Fars province